St. Nicholas Antiochian Orthodox Cathedral is a cathedral church of the Greek Orthodox Patriarchate of Antioch in New York City and the seat of the primate of the Antiochian Orthodox Christian Archdiocese of North America. First established in Lower Manhattan, it is now located in Brooklyn.

History
The first chapel was established in 1895, by Saint Raphael of Brooklyn at a location on Washington Street in Little Syria, Manhattan. He founded the Syrian Orthodox congregation and then moved it to Brooklyn's Pacific Street in 1902. In 1920, the congregation relocated to a building built in 1870 that was formerly an Episcopal church at 355 State Street in Boerum Hill, Brooklyn.

See also
 Antiochian Greek Christians

References

External links
 

Antiochian Orthodox Church in the United States
Boerum Hill
Cathedrals in New York City
Churches in Brooklyn
Eastern Orthodox churches in New York City
Greek Orthodox cathedrals in the United States
Lebanese-American culture in New York (state)
Syrian-American culture in New York City